This is a list of blades of national teams, rowing clubs, schools and universities.  The designs are not trademarked while the sport remains near globally not-for-profit although in some jurisdictions a club may assert design rights and similar to prevent imitation.  It is also possible where identical or near identical blades are watched in winter head races or in summer side-by-side (multi-lane regatta) races for there to be instances of mistaken identity among supporters all of which considerations are commonly borne in mind instead of choosing unpainted blades among established clubs.

National teams

National teams often draw their colours from the related national flags.

Clubs

Club colours may be entirely original or very often based on local governmental or manorial coats of arms.

School and university

As with other academic sports teams the blades used tend to draw as their inspiration heraldry of their academic institutions.  On rare occasions a colour difference between male and female blades is found in academic settings, as in the case of Worcester College, Oxford.

See also
 Oar (sport rowing)
 Gallery of sovereign state flags
 List of coats of arms
 List of universities

References

External links

 Oar Spotter

Blades